Patrick Cosgrave (born 2 June 1982 in Banbridge) is a Northern Irish flat racing jockey based in England. He won his first race in 1999 and went on to become Irish champion apprentice in 2003, having spent two years in the stable of Aidan O'Brien before moving to Britain in 2004.

Major wins 
 Great Britain
 Nunthorpe Stakes - (1) - Borderlescott (2008)
 Sprint Cup - (1) - Markab (2010)
 Golden Jubilee Stakes - (1) - Society Rock (2011)

 Germany
 Grosser Preis von Berlin - (1) - Best Solution (2018)
 Grosser Preis von Baden - (1) - Best Solution (2018)

 Australia
 Caulfield Stakes - (1) - Benbatl (2018)
 Caulfield Cup - (1) - Best Solution (2018)

References 

1982 births
Living people
People from Banbridge
Jockeys from Northern Ireland
Sportspeople from County Down